2013–14 Albanian Cup is the sixty-second season of Albania's annual cup competition. KF Laçi are the most recent winners of the competition, that being their first Cup trophy.

Ties are played in a two-legged format similar to those of European competitions. If the aggregate score is tied after both games, the team with the higher number of away goals advances. If the number of away goals is equal in both games, the match is decided by extra time and a penalty shoot-out, if necessary.

Preliminary round
In order to reduce the number of participating teams for the first round to 32, a preliminary tournament is played. In contrast to the main tournament, the preliminary tournament is held as a single-leg knock-out competition. Matches were played on 25 September 2013 and involved the teams from Albanian Second Division.

|-

|}

First round
All 28 teams of the 2013–14 Superliga and First Division entered in this round along with the four qualifiers from the preliminary round. The first legs were played on 23 October 2013 and the second legs took place on 6 November 2013.

|}

Second round
All 16 qualified teams from First round progressed to the second round. The first legs were played on 4 December 2013 and the second legs took place on 18 December 2013.

|}

Quarter-finals

|}

Teuta advanced to the semi finals.

Skënderbeu advanced to the semi finals.

Kukësi advanced to the semi finals.

Flamurtari advanced to the semi finals.

Semi-finals

|}

Kukësi advanced to the final.

Flamurtari advanced to the final.

Final

References

External links
 Official website 
 Albanian Cup at soccerway.com

Cup
Albanian Cup seasons
Albanian Cup